Vincent Durand (born 17 May 1984) is a French former football midfielder.

Career
In July 2007, Durand left then Ligue 2 side Chamois Niortais after playing with them for three seasons and subsequently joined FC Martigues in January 2008. He played for Martigues for just five months before transferring to Paris FC in the summer of 2008. On 30 June 2009, Durand returned to his recently relegated hometown club, Chamois Niortais.

Honours
Chamois Niortais
 Championnat National champions: 2005–06
 Championnat de France amateur Group C winners: 2009–10

References

External links
 Vincent Durand career stats at FootballDatabase.eu
 Vincent Durand profile at Foot-National.com

1984 births
Living people
People from Niort
French footballers
Association football midfielders
Chamois Niortais F.C. players
FC Martigues players
Paris FC players
USJA Carquefou players
Ligue 2 players
Championnat National players
Sportspeople from Deux-Sèvres
Footballers from Nouvelle-Aquitaine